UAAP Season 61 is the 1998–99 season of the University Athletic Association of the Philippines which was hosted by the University of the East. The season opened on 11 July 1998, thirty days after the nation's 100th anniversary of declaration of independence from Spain and eleven days after the installation of Joseph Ejercito Estrada as the nation's 13th president.

Basketball

Men's tournament

Elimination round

Playoffs

Championships summary

Seniors Division championships

Juniors Division championships

Overall Championship race
The host school is boldfaced. Final.

Juniors' Division

Seniors' Division

External links
WebArchive: The Official Website of the UAAP 61st Season, hosted by UE
UE – UAAP Scoreboard – Season 61

 
1998 in sports
1998 in multi-sport events
61